Tim Lee (born Tim Xtreme Lee; 1977 in Los Angeles, California), is an American stand-up comedian and biologist living in southern California. His father gave him the middle name Xtreme, hoping his son would grow up to be a stunt man. Lee rejected that path and focused on the sciences for most of his life, studying ecology and evolution at UC San Diego, where he graduated magna cum laude in biology. He went on to complete his PhD at UC Davis, developing simulation and analytical models of population dynamics before becoming a comedian.

Lee has become popular on YouTube with over 4,5 million views on his videos. His standard method of presentation is performing a "parody of a science seminar" complete with visual aids.

References

External links 
 Tim Lee website
 Tim Lee YouTube channel

Living people
American male comedians
21st-century American comedians
21st-century American biologists
1977 births
University of California, Davis alumni